(born Go Seung-Seong (高勝成, 고승성) 5 August 1950) is a Japanese professional golfer of Korean ancestry.

Takahashi was born in Asahikawa, Hokkaidō. He won 10 tournaments on the Japan Golf Tour.

Professional wins (30)

Japan Golf Tour wins (10)

*Note: The 1985 Mizuno Open was shortened to 54 holes due to weather.

Japan Golf Tour playoff record (1–5)

Asia Golf Circuit wins (1)
1976 Korean Open

Other wins (4)
1979 Gunma Open
1986 Ibaraki Open
1987 Kuzuha International, Setonaikai Open

Japan Senior PGA Tour wins (13)
2000 (2) Japan PGA Senior Championship, Japan Senior Open
2001 (2) Komatsu Open, FANCL Senior Classic
2002 (1) FANCL Senior Classic
2003 (3) FANCL Senior Classic, PGA Philanthropy Big Rizak Senior Tournament, Japan Senior Open
2004 (2) Castle Hill Open, Japan Senior Open
2005 (1) PGA Philanthropy Rebornest Senior Open
2007 (1) Aderans Wellness Open
2017 (1) Trust Group Cup Sasebo Senior Open

Other senior wins (2)
2004 MK Charity Senior Open
2017 Kansai Pro Golf Grand Senior Championship

Team appearances
World Cup (representing Japan): 1987
Four Tours World Championship (representing Japan): 1989

See also
List of golfers with most Japan Golf Tour wins

References

External links

Katsunari Takahashi at the PGA of Japan official website 

Japanese male golfers
Japan Golf Tour golfers
People from Asahikawa
Sportspeople from Hokkaido
1950 births
Living people